The Llinars Bridge this bridge is the first steel structure in the high-speed railway (HSR) joining Barcelona and the French Border.

After analyzing many possible color combinations for the Llinars bridge, the designers selected blue for the members above the deck level and gray for the bottom of the longitudinal beams. This combination was intended to make the structure appear more slender.

Description
The  Llinars bridge comprises two parts:
The location of the piers was dictated by the highly skewed angle of the highway crossing and by the launching process used to erect the bridge. The final bridge features a composite steel and concrete deck suspended on structural steel tied members.

Construction
Construction of the Llinars bridge began in 2003.
An effort was made to develop an aesthetically pleasing solution that would be transparent and well suited to the site. To avoid interfering with the operation of Barcelona’s critically important tollway, incremental launching construction methods were used for the composite steel and concrete section. This section includes a deck that is a continuous structure with five spans.

The flange width, does not vary along the girder.
A complex steel structure with innovative aesthetics. This High-Speed Rail Bridge required a complex dynamic analysis. The launching method used for construction avoided any interference with the traffic below and to complete the structure on time and budget.

References

Sobrino, J.A.; Moving at the speed of steel. Civil Engineering Magazine, Volume 78, Number 4 pp. 69–75. ASCE, April 2008.
Sobrino J.A.; Two steel bridges for the high speed railway line in Spain. WILEY-VCH Verlag GmbH & Co. KGaA, Weinheim. Stahlbau, vol 79, issue 3, pp. 181–187, March 2010.

External links
 
 

 

 
 
 

Bridges in Catalonia
High-speed rail in Spain
Railway bridges in Spain